Florian Orth (born 24 July 1989 in Schwalmstadt) is a German athlete specialising in the middle-distance events, primarily the 1500 metres. He represented his country at two outdoor and three indoor European Championships.

In March 2017, he married fellow German distance runner, Maren Kock.

Competition record

Personal bests
Outdoor
1500 metres – 3:34.54 (Oordegem-Lede 2014)
3000 metres – 7:44.65 (Oordegem-Lede 2014)
Indoor
1500 metres – 3:39.97 (Karlsruhe 2013)
3000 metres – 7:49.48 (Karlsruhe 2015)

References

External links 

 
 
 

German male middle-distance runners
1989 births
Living people
People from Schwalmstadt
Sportspeople from Kassel (region)
Athletes (track and field) at the 2016 Summer Olympics
Olympic athletes of Germany